Rosère Manguélé (born 22 May 1985) is a French former professional footballer, who played as a midfielder, and chairman of amateur club US Persan 03.

Career
Manguélé was born in Saint-Denis

Early in his career he played two games on the professional level in Ligue 2 for LB Châteauroux.

Manguélé was a player-manager at amateur club FC Chambly, which he helped through consecutive promotions from National 2 to National.

His younger brother Jean-Christophe Bahebeck played the 2013 FIFA U-20 World Cup in the Turkey.

References 

1985 births
Living people
Sportspeople from Saint-Denis, Seine-Saint-Denis
Association football defenders
French footballers
Ligue 2 players
Championnat National players
Championnat National 2 players
LB Châteauroux players
FC Sète 34 players
Pacy Ménilles RC players
Évreux FC 27 players
Red Star F.C. players
FC Chambly Oise players
Entente SSG players
French sportspeople of Republic of the Congo descent
Footballers from Seine-Saint-Denis
Black French sportspeople